Douma may refer to:

Places
 Douma, Burkina Faso
 Douma, Lebanon
 Duma, Nablus, also spelled Douma, a Palestinian town
 Douma District, Syria
 Douma, Syria, the capital of Douma District

People 
 Barthold Douma van Burmania (1695–1766), Dutch statesman and ambassador
 Carmen Douma-Hussar (born 1977), Canadian middle-distance runner
  (born 1933), Dutch architect, see Leerdam railway station
 Danny Douma (born 1950s), American singer-songwriter and guitarist
 Felix Douma (1941–2008), Dutch-born Canadian scholar, writer, teacher, cellist, and translator 
 Jeffrey Douma, American choral conductor
 Sytse Douma (born 1942), Dutch organizational theorist
 Yacine Douma (born 1973), French judoka
 Ennik Douma (born 2001), birth name of Canadian-Korean singer Jeon So-mi

Other
A synonym for the plant genus Hyphaene
An alternative spelling of Duma, a Russian assembly with advisory or legislative functions
Douma chemical attack

See also
 Christos G. Doumas (born 1933), Greek archaeology professor 
 Duma (disambiguation)

ar:دوما (توضيح)